Chang Chau-hsiung (born 3 February 1942) is a Taiwanese physician and politician. He has served as the vice-chairman of People First Party since 2000.

Early life
Born in Takao Prefecture, Taiwan, Empire of Japan, Chang was a physician who graduated from National Taiwan University with an MD in 1967.

Early career
In 1967, Chang finished his surgical training in the university hospital. He then served as a resident doctor and chief resident doctor until 1972. He then went to the United States for further training. He worked in Michael Reese Hospital, Texas Heart Institute and Mokral Hospital for medical research and surgical practice. He returned to Taiwan in 1976.

Chang worked in the university hospital as a part-time attending physician from 1976 to 1977. He worked at Chang Gung Memorial Hospital from 1976 to 1999, and was the president of Chang Gung University from 1997 to 1999. He is the author of sixteen and coauthor of 167 scientific citation index papers.

Political career
Chang ran as an independent vice-presidential candidate (on the ticket of James Soong) in the 2000 elections. Along with Soong, he established the People First Party in 2000, after their defeat in the presidential election. In 2006, Chang announced his retirement from politics after Soong heavily lost in the Taipei mayoral election.

Personal life
He is married to Lee Fang-hui with two sons.

See also
 Politics of Taiwan

References

 Soong chooses `non-political' doctor as his running mate. Taipei Times, Nov 12, 1999. Accessed 2011-02-12.
 Lien urges Chang to run for Kaohsiung. The China Post, June 7, 2002. Accessed 2011-02-12.

1942 births
Living people
National Taiwan University alumni
People First Party (Taiwan) politicians
Taiwanese surgeons
Politicians of the Republic of China on Taiwan from Kaohsiung